Cyne is a genus of flowering plants belonging to the family Loranthaceae.

It is native to the Philippines, the Maluku Islands and New Guinea. They are found at elevations ranging from sea level to subalpine.

Description
They are parasitic plants with epicortical roots (on top of the bark) and secondary haustoria (a structure developed for penetrating the host plant's tissues).
The leaves are decussate (opposite with successive pairs borne at right angles to the last) and the venation is pinnate.
It has flowers which are a much contracted raceme of 1 or more decussate pairs of triads (groups of three). They are rarely dyads (groups of 2),
developing below and breaking through a shell of cork, raising a rupturing blister or calyptra as the flowers expand. The triads and flowers have minute peduncles (flower stalks) and pedicels, each flower has a bract (modified leaf), those of each triad forming an involucre (flower and leaf structure). It has 6 or more petals, which are more or less choripetalous (having separate petals). The anthers are basifixed, and sessile (attached without a stalk). The style is often basally articulate and the stigma is usually capitate (looking like the head of a pin). The fruit (or seed caspule) is ellipsoid (in shape), with a persistent stylar base.

Known species
As accepted by Kew:

The type species is Cyne banahaensis.

Taxonomy
The genus name of Cyne is presumed to be of French origin and means "Moon". It also could refer to the Old English word cyne meaning royal. It was first described and published in Bull. Jard. Bot. Buitenzorg, séries 3, Vol.10 on page 306 in 1929.

The genus is recognized by the United States Department of Agriculture and the Agricultural Research Service, but they do not list any known species.

References

Other sources
 Barlow, B.A. (1993) Conspectus of the Genera Amylotheca, Cyne, Decaisnina, Lampas, Lepeostegeres, and Loxanthera (Loranthaceae). Blumea 38: 65–126.

External links
 Has a flower image of Cyne perfoliata

Loranthaceae
Loranthaceae genera
Plants described in 1929
Flora of the Philippines
Flora of the Maluku Islands
Flora of New Guinea